Vladislav Igorevich Rudenko (born 15 March 1996) is a Russian football player. He plays for FC Chernomorets Novorossiysk.

Club career
He made his debut in the Russian Professional Football League for FC Taganrog on 28 March 2015 in a game against FC Alania Vladikavkaz.

On 30 May 2016, he came on as a substitute with 19 minutes left in the game of his FC SKA Rostov-on-Don against FC Astrakhan and scored a hat-trick in the next 12 minutes.

He made his Russian Football National League debut for FC Avangard Kursk on 24 July 2018 in a game against FC Spartak-2 Moscow.

References

External links
 Profile by Russian Professional Football League

1996 births
Sportspeople from Rostov-on-Don
Living people
Russian people of Ukrainian descent
Russian footballers
FC SKA Rostov-on-Don players
Association football forwards
FC Avangard Kursk players
FC Luch Vladivostok players
FC Taganrog players
FC Chayka Peschanokopskoye players
FC Chita players
FC Chernomorets Novorossiysk players